The 1964 race riots in Singapore involved a series of communal race-based civil disturbances between the Malays and Chinese in Singapore following its merger with Malaysia in 1963, and were considered to be the "worst and most prolonged in Singapore's postwar history". The term is also used to refer specifically to two riots on 21 July 1964 and 2 September 1964, particularly the former, during which 23 people died and 454 others suffered severe injuries.

The riots are seen as pivotal in leading up to the independence of Singapore in 1965, its policies of multiracialism and multiculturalism, and to justify laws such as the Internal Security Act.

Political context from 1963 to 1964

Singapore's union with Malaysia in 1963 

16 September 1963 marked the year of Singapore's merger with Malaysia for economic and security interests as the former lacked the natural resources for survival. Malaysia's Prime Minister Tunku had initially rejected Lee Kuan Yew's proposal for a merger due to the fear of communist insurgency in Singapore and the large number of ethnic Chinese in Singapore which might outnumber the Malay population in Malaysia. (Additionally, Chinese Malaysians constituted a large portion of the population of Malaya/Malaysia at the time and continue to this day.)

However, Tunku changed his mind to call for the merger with Singapore, when the anti-communist Singaporean leader Ong Eng Guan was expelled from the PAP but still won a by-election as an independent.  Malaysia was concerned about the stability of the PAP, as its collapse may have led to Singapore's use as a base to spread communism to Malaysia. Furthermore, maintenance of the high number of Malays in Malaysia was addressed by the inclusion of Borneo island's regions Sabah and Sarawak into the Malaysian federation.

Ideological differences: PAP vs. UMNO 

The People's Action Party (PAP), the dominant political party in Singapore, and United Malays National Organisation (UMNO), the dominant political party in Malaysia, had two differing competing political ideologies. The PAP, led by Lee Kuan Yew, adopted non-communal politics whereby it called for equality for all regardless of race or religion. By contrast, UMNO, led by Tunku Abdul Rahman, advocated for the provision of special rights and privileges for the bumiputeras (indigenous Malays in Malaysia); meant as a form of affirmative action as the Straits Chinese had traditionally better economic affluence and the Malays tended to be poorer. As part of a "cold peace" between the two parties, Tunku Abdul Rahman assured Lee that the Alliance Party would not get involved in Singapore's domestic politics as long as the PAP confined its political role to Singapore.

Despite this understanding, Singapore UMNO (SUMNO) participated in the island's 1963 general election by competing in three Malay-dominated constituencies. The Singapore Alliance Party, which was supported by UMNO, also fielded 42 candidates in mostly Malay-dominated areas, but both parties failed to win even a single seat. Conversely, the PAP won 37 out of 51 seats, which was seen by UMNO as threatening and led to a further deterioration in the relationship between UMNO and PAP.

With the breakdown of the truce, and in an attempt to portray itself as a Malaysian political party, the PAP fielded candidates in the Malay peninsula in the 1964 Federal elections on 25 April 1964. The PAP won one seat in Selangor, which was seen as an intrusion into Malaysia's political space and viewed by Tunku as a humiliating blow to the credibility of UMNO. Lee's intentions of creating a Malaysian Malaysia, advocating for equal treatment and opportunity for all races, was viewed with suspicion and hostility by UMNO. In an attempt to safeguard Malaysia's political interest and to sway the Singaporean Malays' support towards UMNO, UMNO and its allies escalated their anti-PAP propaganda campaign using newspapers and political rallies, setting the stage for the subsequent communal riots.

Riot of 21 July 1964 
This riot occurred during the procession to celebrate Mawlid (the birthday of the Islamic prophet Muhammad).  Twenty-five thousand majority-Muslim Malay people had gathered at the Padang. Aside from the recital of some prayers and engagement in some religious activities, a series of fiery speeches was also made by the organisers, instigating racial tensions. During the procession, clashes occurred between the Malays and the Chinese which eventually led to a riot spreading to other areas. There are multiple accounts and reports on how the riots began.

Events leading up to the outbreak of the July 1964 riots 
The official state (Malaysia) narrative on the cause of 21 July 1964 characterizes the UMNO and Malay-language newspaper Utusan Melayu controlled by UMNO as playing an instigating role. It points to the publishing of anti-PAP headlines and incitement of the Malays against the PAP. Utusan Melayu was the first Malay owned newspaper, founded by Singapore's first President Yusuf Ishak in 1939. Utusan Melayu'''s stated aim was to "fight for religion, race and its homeland", placing key emphasis on the rights and the elevated status of the local Malays in Singapore. Utusan Melayu aroused anti-PAP sentiments among the local Malays by publishing and amplifying the Singapore government's decision to evict the Malays from the Crawford area for redevelopment of the urban spaces. This was seen as a violation of Malay rights. The newspaper did not report that along with the Malays, the Chinese residents were also evicted.

To address the grievances of the Malays, Lee held a meeting with the various Malay organisations on 19 July. This angered UMNO, as it was not invited to attend this meeting. In that meeting, Lee assured the Malays that they would be given ample opportunities in education, employment and skill training for them to compete effectively with the non-Malays in the country. However, PM Lee refused to promise the granting of special rights for the Malays. This meeting satisfied some Malay community leaders and agitated some, who had the view that the needs and pleas of the Malays were not being heard. The Singapore Malayan National Committee was one group that was not convinced of PM Lee's promises.  In order to rally the support of the Malays to go against the PAP government, leaflets containing rumours of the Chinese in Singapore trying to kill the Malays were published and distributed throughout the island on 20 July 1964. The spread of such information was also carried out during the procession of Muhammad's birthday celebration, triggering the riots.

As a form of retaliation and to further incite the conflict between the Malays and PAP, UMNO called for a meeting that was attended by close to 12,000 people. This meeting was chaired by Secretary-General of UMNO Syed Ja’far Albar who referred to Lee as an "Ikan Sepat" (Three spot gourami), a mud-dwelling fish, and called for collective action against the Chinese community led by the PAP. While this convention was underway, communal violence was sparked in Bukit Mertajam killing two people.  This was seen as a prelude to the much bigger riots that followed on 21 July 1964.

Former Minister for Social Affairs, Othman Wok wrote in his autobiography that he had come to know from one of the reporters from the Utusan Melayu that the latter had known about the potential riots even before their outbreak, which raised official suspicions that UMNO leaders might have orchestrated the riots. Othman also makes references to some key political meetings which took place between the Malay community in Singapore and politicians in Singapore to express their grievances. Accounts from the meetings indicate that the Malays in Singapore had no major grievances and that UMNO's Secretary-General Syed Ja’afar was responsible for instigating them. Some of the matters brought up by the Malay community included infrastructural issues that Malay schools faced and these issues were contrary to what the UMNO and Utusan Melayu had portrayed.

Origins of the riots
The UMNO and the Malaysian Federal government blamed the Indonesian forces for stirring up potential conflict among the Malay Kampong regions. However, this was denied by W.A Luscombe the second secretary of the Australian High Commission in Kuala Lumpur due to the lack of evidence.

From the Malaysian government's point of view, Lee Kuan Yew and PAP were responsible for instigating these series of riots and discontent among the Malay community in Singapore. UMNO and Tun Razak had attributed to the Malay's anger and hostility towards the Chinese and Lee Kuan Yew's former speech made on 30 June 1964 for passing inflammatory remarks of the UMNO's communal politics. However, the American Embassy had refuted these claims by stating that Utusan Melayu could have misquoted Lee's speech.

Whereas the PAP and Lee Kuan Yew strongly believed that the 1964 July riot was not a spontaneous one, as UNMO had always tried to stir anti-PAP sentiments and communal politics among the Singapore Malays. Furthermore, they had often used fiery speeches and Utusan Melayu as a tool to propagate pro-Malay sentiments and to sway their support towards UMNO.

 Outbreak of the July 1964 race riots  
On 21 July 1964 afternoon, about 20,000 Malays representing the different Muslim organisations in Singapore had gathered for the procession to begin to mark the birthday celebrations of Prophet Muhammad. The procession started at Padang and was planned to end at the Jamiyah Headquarters located at Lorong 12, Geylang area. The dominant narration of the July 1964 Racial riot on public forums and history textbooks is simplified and remembered as a riot that involved 20,000 Chinese throwing bottles and rocks at the Malays at the Padang. In reality, some scholars argue that the bottles and rocks being overthrown and clash with a Malay policeman who tried to restrain the Malays were not the reasons for the cause of the riots. But rather, part of the reasons could be also attributed to the distribution of leaflets to the Malay community before the start of the procession by a group named Pertobohan Perjuangan Kebangsaan Melayu Singapore''.

The leaflets instigated anti-Chinese and anti-PAP sentiments among the Malays as it called for a greater union of the Malays to oppose and wipe out the Chinese as they were believed to be starting a ploy to kill the Malays. SUMO's (Singapore Malay National Organisation) Secretary-General Syed Esa Almenoar had given a fiery speech on the need for the Malay community to fight for their rights instead of giving a religious and non-political speech. This further heightened the suspicions that the Malays had toward the PAP and the Chinese community. The procession was being led by Yang di-Pertuan Negara, Yusof bin Ishak and other PAP political leaders such as Othman Wok. The procession went along Arab Street, Kallang and Geylang areas. The riots occurred around 5 p.m., where a few Malay youths were seen to be hitting a Chinese cyclist along Victoria Street, which was intervened against by a Chinese constable. Mr. Othman Wok recounted in his autobiography that while he and his team were along Lorong 14, a group of youths believed to be from UMNO shouted "strike the Chinese" and these youths were seen to be marching in front of Wok's contingent. The riots which occurred around Victoria and Geylang had spread to other parts of Singapore such as Palmer Road and Madras Street. The police force, military and the Gurkha battalion were activated to curb the violence and at 9.30 p.m., a curfew was imposed whereby everyone was ordered to stay at home.

The riot saw serious damages to the private properties, loss of lives, and injuries sustained by the citizens. According to the reports from the police force, a total of 220 incidents were recorded with 4 being killed and 178 people have sustained some injuries. Furthermore, close to 20 shophouses owned by the Chinese around the Geylang and Jalan Eunos regions were burnt down. The curfew was lifted at 6 a.m. on 22 July 1964.  Clashes and tensions between the Malays and Chinese re-arose, so the curfew was re-imposed at 11.30 a.m.

Political leaders of both Malaysia and Singapore, Tunku Abdul Rahman and Lee Kuan Yew, each led national radio broadcasts and emphasized the need to maintain peace and harmony among the different racial and religious groups.  Both appealed to the people to remain indoors and not participate in any unlawful acts.

The racial riots subsided by 24 July 1964, as the number of communal clashes reported was reduced to seven cases. On 2 August, the imposition of the curfew since 21 July was completely lifted and the high police and military supervision removed.

Riot of 2 September 1964
After the July riots, a period of peace was broken by another riot on 2 September 1964. This riot was triggered by the murder of a Malay trishaw rider along Geylang Serai and this incident sparked attempts of stabbings and heightened violence. 13 people were killed, 106 sustained injuries while 1,439 were arrested.

Indonesia was accused of encouraging communal strife to coincide with the landing of the Indonesian commandos in Johor Bahru. This accusation was found to be highly improbable by the American Ambassador to Singapore, who cited the tense situation following the July riots as the cause of the September riot.

Aftermath

Commission of inquiry 
Following the July riots, the Singapore government requested that the Malaysian federal government appoint a commission of inquiry to investigate the causes of the riots, but this was declined by the Malaysian government.
Following the September riots, the Malaysian government finally agreed to form such a commission, with closed-door hearings beginning in April 1965; however the findings of the report have remained confidential.

Singapore's separation from Malaysia 

According to Lee Kuan Yew, there were irreconcilable differences between the two from the outset, due to the UMNO's communal politics. The racial riots in July 1964, triggered and intensified the political rift between PAP and UMNO. Communal politics was often the central theme of Malaysian Prime Minister Tunku Abdul Rahman's speeches and he often pointed the finger at the PAP leaders and Lee Kuan Yew for interfering in his political party's decisions and for contesting in Malaya's federal elections advocating for a non-communal politics. Furthermore, Tunku Abdul Rahman's encouragement of racial tension and anti-PAP sentiments among Singaporean Malays made it difficult for the PAP to work with UMNO to forge good relations. Thus, these ideological differences in party politics and the outbreaks of the racial riots in 1964 were some of the important contributing factors which led to the eventual separation of Singapore from Malaysia, paving the way for Singapore's independence in June 1965. Singapore has finally declared an independent and sovereign state on 9 August 1965.

Social Memory of 1964 race riots 
The narration of the 1964 race riots often includes the political dimension where UMNO and PAP had a political rift. This narration does not examine how the Singaporeans who had lived through this period of time had viewed these Racial Riots. Thus, Cheng (2001) attempted to revive the memories of the people who had lived through the racial riots, and most of them associated the racial riots as more of religious tension as it took place during Muhammad's birthday procession. Some of the Singaporeans felt that this riot had not much of a significant impact on them since they were living in regions far from Geylang and they did not view this riot as being serious. Contrary to the official discourse which cites Syed Ja'far Albar as the culprit instigating the riots, most of the Malays saw the throwing of a bottle by a Chinese causing the riots while the Chinese saw the Malay's aggressive actions towards their racial group as the main factor for the outbreak of the riot. Most of them did not believe that this riot was due to political incompatibility between PAP and UMNO but rather they viewed this as a mere religious and racial clash.

Principles of multiculturalism and multiracialism 
The July 1964 racial riots played a significant role in shaping some of Singapore's fundamental principles such as multiculturalism and multiracialism once it had gained independence from Malaysia in 1965. The Singapore Constitution emphasized the need to adopt non-discriminatory policies based on race or religion. Furthermore, the state also guaranteed the grant of minority rights and to ensure that the minorities in Singapore are not mistreated, the Maintenance of the Religious Harmony Act was drafted and implemented in 1990. Furthermore, the Presidential Council for the Minority Rights (PCMR) was established in 1970 to ensure that the bills passed by the parliament are not discriminatory against any racial group. The government has used the recollection of the 1964 race riots to frame the national narrative of "rising from the ashes of violence-producing racial and religious acrimony to religious harmony and civil peace". For instance, former Prime Minister Goh had implemented a new curriculum known as National Education to foster social and national cohesiveness among Singaporeans.  In this national education program, students were taught about the 1964 racial riots to educate the younger generation about the detrimental implications of the racial tension to the cohesiveness of a nation. Furthermore, commemorative days such as racial harmony day was also introduced in 1997 to foster greater cultural appreciation and to enable students to inculcate values such as respect. Every year on 21 July, schools commemorate the racial riots to emphasise the need for tolerance among each other. During this commemoration day, schools recall the racial riots that occurred but however, the emphasis on the events are focused on the tension between the Malays and the Chinese rather than on the political and ideological differences between UMNO and PAP.

Internal Security Act 

The Internal Security Act grants the executive powers against actions that may threaten the internal security of Singapore, including those that "promote feelings of ill-will and hostility between different races or other classes of the population likely to cause violence".

See also
 1969 race riots of Singapore
 List of riots in Singapore
 13 May Incident
 Maria Hertogh riots

References

External links
 Communal riots of 1964 (Singapore NLB Infopedia)
 Racial Innovation - A Case Study
 In placid Singapore, civil disobedience simmers

1964 riots
Riots and civil disorder in Malaysia
Religiously motivated violence in Malaysia
Singapore in Malaysia
Race riots in Singapore
1964 in Malaysia
1964 in Singapore
Singapore
Protests in Malaysia
Kallang
Geylang
1964 crimes in Malaysia
1964 crimes in Singapore